LCK may refer to:

 Rickenbacker International Airport, Columbus, Ohio (IATA airport code LCK)
 Lockwood railway station, England (National Rail station code LCK)
 The Lymphocyte-specific protein tyrosine kinase, Lck (also called p56-LCK)
 Louis C.K., stand-up comedian, writer, producer, director, and actor
 A shortened form of the word "Luck" used in many Role-playing games
 Language Construction Kit, a feature of the website Zompist.com
 League of Legends Champions Korea, the top-level league for League of Legends competition in South Korea
 Lai Chi Kok station, Hong Kong (MTR station code LCK)
 Lim Chu Kang, Singapore